Descending Stories: Showa Genroku Rakugo Shinju is a Japanese anime television series based on the manga of the same name written and illustrated by Haruko Kumota. The anime series was produced by Studio Deen and directed by Mamoru Hatakeyama, with series composition handled by Jun Kumagai, character designs by Mieko Hosoi and music by Kana Shibue. Prior to the anime series, a two-episode original anime DVD series, titled , was bundled with the seventh and eighth volumes of the manga, which was released on 6 March 2015 and 7 August 2015, respectively.

The first season began airing on 9 January 2016 with an extended 48-minute first episode, and ended on 2 April 2016 with a total of 13 episodes. The opening theme for the first season, titled , was composed by Sheena Ringo and performed by Megumi Hayashibara. It was simulcasted by Crunchyroll in their "Winter 2016" lineup.

The second season, announced at the end of the first season's thirteenth and final episode, began airing on 7 January 2017 and ended on 25 March 2017 with a total of 12 episodes. The staff and cast from the first season reprised their roles in the sequel anime series. The opening theme for the second season, titled , was also composed by Ringo and performed by Hayashibara. Like the first season, Crunchyroll simulcasted the second season in their "Winter 2017" lineup.

Episode list

Season 1

Season 2

References

External links
  
 

Descending Stories: Showa Genroku Rakugo Shinju